Victor Aronstein (1 November 1896 – 13 January 1945) was a German-Jewish medical doctor whose practice in Alt-Hohenschönhausen, Berlin served as a meeting place for communists and social democrats during the rule of the Nazi Party. He was deported to the Łódź Ghetto in 1941 and then moved to Auschwitz, where he was murdered in 1945.

References

1896 births
1945 deaths
People from Margonin
Łódź Ghetto inmates
Physicians from Berlin
German people who died in Auschwitz concentration camp
Jewish physicians
German Jews who died in the Holocaust
20th-century German physicians